Menkeleon is a genus of antlions in the family Myrmeleontidae. There is one described species in Menkeleon, M. bellulus.

References

Further reading

 

Myrmeleontidae
Articles created by Qbugbot
Myrmeleontidae genera